Andrea Baumert, née Arens (born 5 May 1967) is a retired German high jumper.

She finished fifth at the 1990 European Indoor Championships. She represented the sports club SC Charlottenburg, and became West German champion in 1989.

Her personal best jump was 1.98 metres, achieved in August 1989 in Hamburg.

References

1967 births
Living people
German female high jumpers